The International Rugby Hall of Fame (IRHOF) was a hall of fame for rugby union.  It  was created in 1997 in New Zealand and is run as a charitable trust with an address at Chiswick in London.  Most of the trustees are also inductees.  IRHOF accepted new inductees every two years until 2007.  Most inductees are former players, but others who have contributed to the game are eligible. In 2014 it was integrated into the then–IRB Hall of Fame, which then was renamed the World Rugby Hall of Fame.

1997 Inductees 
{| class="wikitable"
!bgcolor="#efefef" width="130"|Nation
!bgcolor="#efefef" width="200"|Inductee
|- align=left
|align=left|  
|Serge Blanco 
|- align=left
|align=left|  
|Danie Craven
|- align=left
|align=left|  
|Frik du Preez 
|- align=left
|align=left|  
|Gareth Edwards 
|- align=left
|align=left|  
|Mark Ella 
|- align=left
|align=left|  
|Mike Gibson  
|- align=left
|align=left|  
|Barry John 
|- align=left
|align=left|  
|Willie John McBride   
|- align=left
|align=left|  
|Colin Meads 
|- align=left
|align=left|  
|Cliff Morgan 
|- align=left
|align=left|  
|George Nēpia 
|- align=left
|align=left|  
|Tony O'Reilly   
|- align=left
|align=left|  
|Hugo Porta 
|- align=left
|align=left|  
|Jean-Pierre Rives 
|- align=left
|align=left|  
|JPR Williams
|}

1999 Inductees
{| class="wikitable"
!bgcolor="#efefef" width="130"|Nation
!bgcolor="#efefef" width="200"|Inductee
|- align=left
|align=left|  
|Gerald Davies
|- align=left
|align=left|  
|Morne du Plessis 
|- align=left
|align=left|  
|Nick Farr-Jones 
|- align=left
|align=left|  
|Andy Irvine  
|- align=left
|align=left|  
|Carwyn James
|- align=left
|align=left|  
|Jack Kyle 
|- align=left
|align=left|  
|Brian Lochore 
|- align=left
|align=left|  
|Philippe Sella 
|- align=left
|align=left|  
|Wavell Wakefield  
|- align=left
|align=left|  
|Wilson Whineray 
|}

2001 Inductees
{| class="wikitable"
!bgcolor="#efefef" width="130"|Nation
!bgcolor="#efefef" width="200"|Inductee
|- align=left
|align=left|  
|Gordon Brown 
|- align=left
|align=left|  
|David Campese 
|- align=left
|align=left|  
|Ken Catchpole 
|- align=left
|align=left|  
|Don Clarke 
|- align=left
|align=left|  
|Mervyn Davies 
|- align=left
|align=left|  
|Sean Fitzpatrick 
|- align=left
|align=left|  
|Michael Lynagh 
|- align=left
|align=left|  
|Bill McLaren, commentator 
|- align=left
|align=left|  
|Hennie Muller 
|- align=left
|align=left|  
|Jean Prat
|}

2003 Inductees
{| class="wikitable"
!bgcolor="#efefef" width="130"|Nation
!bgcolor="#efefef" width="200"|Inductee
|- align=left
|align=left|  
|Bill Beaumont   
|- align=left
|align=left|  
|Gavin Hastings  
|- align=left
|align=left|  
|Tim Horan
|- align=left
|align=left|  
|Michael Jones 
|- align=left
|align=left|  
|Ian Kirkpatrick  
|- align=left
|align=left|  
|John Kirwan 
|- align=left
|align=left|  
|Jo Maso 
|- align=left
|align=left|  
|Syd Millar
|}

2005 Inductees
{| class="wikitable"
!bgcolor="#efefef" width="130"|Nation
!bgcolor="#efefef" width="200"|Inductee
|- align=left
|align=left|  
|Fred Allen 
|- align=left
|align=left|  
|Phil Bennett 
|- align=left
|align=left|  
|André Boniface
|- align=left
|align=left|  
|Naas Botha
|- align=left
|align=left|  
|John Eales  
|- align=left
|align=left|  
|Grant Fox 
|- align=left
|align=left|  
|Dave Gallaher 
|- align=left
|align=left|  
|Martin Johnson  
|- align=left
|align=left|  
|Ian McGeechan 
|- align=left
|align=left|  
|Gwyn Nicholls 
|- align=left
|align=left|  
|Francois Pienaar  
|}

2007 Inductees
{| class="wikitable"
!bgcolor="#efefef" width="130"|Nation
!bgcolor="#efefef" width="200"|Inductee
|- align=left
|align=left|  
|Ieuan Evans
|- align=left
|align=left|  
|Danie Gerber
|- align=left
|align=left|  
| Tom Kiernan
|- align=left
|align=left|  
|Jason Leonard
|- align=left
|align=left|  
|Jonah Lomu
|- align=left
|align=left|  
|Terry McLean (journalist)
|- align=left
|align=left|  
|Graham Mourie
|- align=left
|align=left|  
|Bennie Osler
|- align=left
|align=left|  
|Fergus Slattery
|- align=left
|align=left|  
|Joost van der Westhuizen
|}

Inductees per nation
{| class="wikitable"
|-border=1 cellpadding=5 cellspacing=0
!bgcolor="#efefef" width="130"|Nation
!bgcolor="#efefef" width="120"|Number of Inductees
|- align=center
|align=left| 
|18
|- align=center
|align=left| 
|10
|- align=center
|align=left| 
|9
|- align=center
|align=left| 
|7
|- align=center
|align=left|  
|7
|- align=center
|align=left| 
|6
|- align=center
|align=left| 
|5
|- align=center
|align=left| 
|4
|- align=center
|align=left| 
|1
|}

See also
World Rugby Hall of Fame established in 2006 by World Rugby (previously known as the International Rugby Board).

External links
archive of Official website
Joining the Legends an added Bonus for Wood - Telegraph, November 17, 2005
 
 

Awards established in 1997
Halls of fame in New Zealand
World Rugby Hall of Fame inductees
Lists of rugby union players
Rugby union museums and halls of fame